Love, Peace & Poetry – Vol.1 American is the first volume in the Love, Peace & Poetry series released by QDK Media in 1998. This volume explores obscuro garage rock and psychedelic rock bands from America.

Track listing
 "Shades of Blue" (Darius) – 2:15
 "Danny's Song" (New Tweedy Brothers) – 2:50
 "White Panther" (Arcesia) – 2:34
 "Ride a Rainbow" (Victoria) – 2:46
 "Song of a Gypsy" (Damon) – 2:25
 "Slave Ship" (Jungle) – 5:23
 "Colors" (Hunger) – 2:03
 "Graveyard" (Trizo 50) – 4:45
 "Nam Myo Renge Kyo" (Music Emporium) – 2:35
 "I'll Be on the Inside, If I Can" (The Brain Police) – 3:25
 "Oceans of Fantasy" (Michael Angelo) – 3:01
 "I Need It Higher" (Zerfas) – 4:44
 "There Was a Time" (Lazy Smoke) – 1:57
 "Mister Man" (Hickory Wind) – 3:27
 "Dark Thoughts" (The New Dawn) – 3:00
 "Wild Eyes" (Sidetrack) – 2:10
 "Reflections on a Warm Day" (Patron Saints) – 3:36

Love, Peace & Poetry albums
Garage rock albums by American artists
Psychedelic rock albums by American artists
1998 compilation albums
Rock compilation albums
Compilation albums by American artists